King Edward's School (KES), Bath, Somerset, England is an independent co-educational day school providing education for 1,016 pupils aged 3 to 18.
The school is a member of The Headmasters' and Headmistresses' Conference.

The school was established in the 16th century in a city centre site, founded in 1552. In the 1960s it moved to the outskirts onto a multi building site. In addition to the academic curriculum the schools includes drama, music, sport and a combined cadet force.

King Edward's School Bath was judged as "excellent" in every category in the school's 2015 Independent Schools Inspectorate (ISI) report. The report noted that "The school's extra-curricular provision is outstanding", "Achievements outside the curriculum are both numerous and outstanding" and "The quality of the pupils' achievements and learning is excellent".

The school was ranked as one of the top four independent schools in the south west by The Sunday Times Schools Guide, Parent Power Survey based upon 2016 academic results.

History

The school was founded in 1552 under laws set out in the Charities Act of 1545, which had been passed by Henry VIII to use funds from the dissolution of the monasteries to replace monastic grammar schools such as that run by Bath Abbey. The Mayor of Bath and one of the members of parliament for Bath, Edward Ludwell, petitioned Edward VI for land previously owned by the priory, to establish the school, initially in Frog Lane (present-day New Bond St) then outside the city walls, to support ten poor people, which also prevented the crown from selling off the land previously held by the priory. In 1583 the school moved to the disused Church of St Mary by the north gate of the city just within the city walls. The city corporation misappropriated the considerable funds from the land granted under Letters Patent, failing to maintain or improve the school until it was exposed in the Court of Chancery in 1734. Around 1750 a new building was erected for the school in Broad Street.

The secondary school relocated from its site at Broad Street in central Bath in the 1960s to a  site at North Road in the southeastern edge of the city, previously occupied by St Christopher's Preparatory School. The junior school (7- to 11-year-olds) remained on the Broad Street site until the summer of 1990 (often mis-quoted as 1986, possibly due to errors originally made in an architectural report from the early 2000s and repeated by the local Planning Office) when it transferred to a new building in the North Road school grounds. The old Broad Street site, which was built in 1754 by Thomas Jelly and is a Grade II* Listed building, remains empty. In 1997 an application to turn the building into a public house by Samuel Smith Brewery was refused. A scheme for use as a hotel has also been withdrawn. The building remains on the Heritage at Risk Register but work to repair the roof has reduced the risk to the property. Proposals to use it as a temporary shelter for the homeless were rejected in 2018, by the brewery, claiming that work would be "commencing very soon".

In the 1990s, while Peter Winter was Headmaster the school took the steps towards full co-education. In 2005 there were plans to move the 'pre-preparatory' school, located in Weston, Bath, on to the North Road site. However, for a range of reasons it never materialised. In 2008 the school achieved the best examination results of Bath schools for A level and GCSE examination results.

Site

The Senior and Junior School is situated on a 19-acre campus, with views across Bath. The school is made up of several buildings. The main block (Q) is the primary building used for English, Maths, Music, Physics and Chemistry. The science labs in Q block are currently under refurbishment, due to reopen in Autumn 2022. The main block also incorporates the Wroughton Theatre and the Music classrooms. Nethersole House, which was built in the 19th century, now houses the Religious and Philosophical Studies department, Classics, History, Business Studies and Economics and Learning Support, as well as the Headmaster's Study and Reception. The Holbeche Centre is home to the Sixth Form centre, as well as Art, Design & Technology and Photography classrooms, G block and the newly finished L block are nearby. The sports hall at the bottom of the site is used for assemblies, as well as sports. The senior school opened a new building (B Block) in September 2008 which accommodates many of the major departments including Biology, Psychology and I.C.T. The Wessex Building is located to the north of Nethersole House and was opened in 2015 by the Earl of Wessex and holds the Porter Library, Willet dining hall and a conference suite. The school opened its newest sporting facility, an all-weather pitch, in November 2016 by Rio Olympic gold medalist, Crista Cullen. The Rose is a new drama centre with state of the art technology and facilities. It is located at the bottom of the school below the lower entrance. In 2020 the school's newest facility was opened. The L block is a language block purely intended for language purposes that sits between the G block and the Holbeche Centre, it is connected to these two blocks by doors. A temporary building called M block is currently used to teach Geography.

Drama and music

The school includes drama and music departments. The drama department puts on a school play each year and recent performances have included Fiddler on the Roof and Pride and Prejudice. There is also a lower school play which is aimed for pupils in years 7 to 9 and regularly has casts of up to 80 pupils which recently included The Wind in the Willows and Disney's Beauty and The Beast. The School has also recently introduced LAMDA exams and taken a show to the Edinburgh Fringe.

In late 2017 the school performed "Pop the Musical", a show written by the school based on a book by author Catherine Bruton, who teaches English at the school.

The Music department currently has over 20 instrumental and choral groups of varying musical styles. The school has partnerships with Bath Abbey and Bath's resident orchestra, Bath Philharmonia Orchestra, with annual concert performances in Bath’s historical venues including The Assembly Rooms and the Guildhall.

Every year the Music department organises the KES Musical Festival which includes concerts throughout Bath as well as numerous performances and concerts in the school itself. The Senior Orchestra was also the overall winner for orchestral music in the Mid Somerset Festival in 2006, 2007, 2009, 2010, 2011 and 2012.

Sport

The school has a further 17-acre site at nearby Bathampton, which is home to the school's playing fields and sports pavilion. The major games are rugby, hockey, cricket and netball. Minor sports include athletics, cross-country, tennis, football, rounders, badminton, dance, gymnastics and table tennis. Former England rugby coach Andy Robinson used to teach rugby, physical education and mathematics at the school while he was playing (amateur rugby) for Bath Rugby Club.

In previous years the school had competitive netball squads over a range of school years. In particular, the under 19 squad came third at the national finals in both 2009 and 2010. Alternative sports such as jiu jitsu and squash are also played.

Combined Cadet Force

The school also has a Combined Cadet Force (CCF) which was formerly affiliated with the Light Infantry and is now affiliated to the King's Royal Hussars (Royal Armoured Corps). Having been founded in 1900, King Edward's CCF is one of the oldest CCF contingents in the country. In recent years the CCF has also included cadets from Beechen Cliff School and from 2015 to 2019 it also welcomed pupils from Hayesfield Girl School. Pupils, both girls and boys, may join the CCF from year 9 onwards and enjoy a range of activities each week developing skills which can be put into practice on a number of excursions, including multi-day CCF-run exercises on Army training grounds, as well as Combined Cadet Force and Army Cadet Force-run camps throughout the year, in each March, September, July and November.
In 2019 the CCF formed a Corps of Drums, and since then has been taking cadets on ACF and CCF-run music training camps.
The Cadet Force is one of the cadet forces which are involved in Bath's annual Remembrance Sunday ceremonies, involving attending the main ceremonial parade and a march through the city streets, which has since 2019 included performance by the Corps of Drums.

International links

King Edward's School and Wagwer School in Kenya are global development partnership schools, part of the Department for International Development (DFID) initiative, which seeks to encourage an understanding and knowledge of the world though exchange visits and joint curricular work. Under the scheme which is sponsored by the British Government teachers from Kenya are able to visit KES and teachers from KES are able to visit Wagwer.

The school also runs exchange programmes with schools in Aix-en-Provence (France), Braunschweig (Germany) and Pamplona (Spain).

The school also produced two Olympians who represented Great Britain for the 2012 London Olympic Games.

Controversy

In 2001, the school made national headlines after 26 pupils were taught the wrong Shakespeare play (Hamlet) in preparation for an A-level examination. The mistake was only realised after the pupils had entered the examination hall. The OCR exam board decided to award their marks according to previous papers and coursework.

In 2002, a 14-year-old girl had to be taken to hospital with alcohol poisoning during a trip to France.

In 2015, former teacher Timothy Snowdon, was jailed for four years for sexual assaults against a pupil that took place in the 1990s.

Notable alumni
See also :Category:People educated at King Edward's School, Bath
Former pupils of the school are called Old Edwardians and include:
Bill Bailey – comedian, musician and actor
Peter Chilvers - musician, software designer and Brian Eno collaborator
Sebastian Cox – Military Historian
General Sir Jack Deverell – Former Commander-in-Chief Northern Europe
Adrian Flook – former Conservative MP for Taunton
John Glen – Conservative MP for Salisbury
Jonathan Green - science fiction and fantasy writer
Toby Longworth – Actor
Ross Lowis Mangles – Recipient of the Victoria Cross
Max Ojomoh - rugby player
Sir William Edward Parry – Rear-admiral and Arctic explorer
Tom Payne – Actor
Norman Pounds - Geographer and historian
Sir Ian Prosser – Deputy Chairman of British Petroleum
Thomas de Quincey – Author and intellectual
Chris Rapley – Director of the Science Museum
Harold Crofton Sleigh - Founder of H.C.Sleigh Shipping Company, & Golden Fleece Petroleum Company, Melbourne,  Australia. 
Henry Thomas (rugby union) - International rugby player
Thomas Rosewell – Nonconformist minister accused of high treason
Andrew Wakefield – Former surgeon and medical researcher famous for the MMR vaccine controversy

References

Member schools of the Headmasters' and Headmistresses' Conference
Private schools in Bath and North East Somerset
Educational institutions established in the 1550s
Grade II* listed buildings in Bath, Somerset
1552 establishments in England
Grade II* listed educational buildings
Structures on the Heritage at Risk register in Somerset
King Edward VI Schools
Schools in Bath, Somerset